The French language term escadre refers to a naval or military aviation unit equivalent to the English language terms :

 squadron (naval)
 wing (air force) (e.g. United States Air Force)
 group (air force) (e.g. Royal Air Force)